This is a list of players sent off in NRL matches since the reunification of rugby league in Australia after the Super League war in 1998. Referees have the option to send players from the field for a variety of reasons, but it has mostly been utilised for serious foul play in recent seasons. 

In 2022 while playing for the South Sydney Rabbitohs, Taane Milne became the first player to be sent off in any NRL finals match. He was the first player sent off in an Australian first grade rugby league finals match since 1994. No player has ever been sent off in any NRL Grand Final.

The table below also has the result of any charges laid by the NRL match review and the resulting penalty (if any) laid by the NRL Judiciary.

List of players sent off

Statistics

|- style="text-align:center; font-size:90%"
! Season !! Number !! Total games(including finals)
|- style="text-align:center; font-size:90%"
| 1998 || 17 || 253
|- style="text-align:center; font-size:90%"
| 1999 || 8 || 213
|- style="text-align:center; font-size:90%"
| 2000 || 8 || 191
|- style="text-align:center; font-size:90%"
| 2001 || 2 || 191
|- style="text-align:center; font-size:90%"
| 2002 || 5 || 189
|- style="text-align:center; font-size:90%"
| 2003 || 6 || 189
|- style="text-align:center; font-size:90%"
| 2004 || 4 || 189
|- style="text-align:center; font-size:90%"
| 2005 || 2 || 189
|- style="text-align:center; font-size:90%"
| 2006 || 4 || 189
|- style="text-align:center; font-size:90%"
| 2007 || 5 || 201
|- style="text-align:center; font-size:90%"
| 2008 || 6 || 201
|- style="text-align:center; font-size:90%"
| 2009 || 2 || 201
|- style="text-align:center; font-size:90%"
| 2010 || 1 || 201
|- style="text-align:center; font-size:90%"
| 2011 || 3 || 201
|- style="text-align:center; font-size:90%"
| 2012 || 3 || 201
|- style="text-align:center; font-size:90%"
| 2013 || 2 || 201
|- style="text-align:center; font-size:90%"
| 2014 || 0 || 201
|- style="text-align:center; font-size:90%"
| 2015 || 1 || 201
|- style="text-align:center; font-size:90%"
| 2016 || 0 || 201
|- style="text-align:center; font-size:90%"
| 2017 || 0 || 201
|- style="text-align:center; font-size:90%"
| 2018 || 1 || 201
|- style="text-align:center; font-size:90%"
| 2019 || 1 || 201
|- style="text-align:center; font-size:90%"
| 2020 || 3 || 167
|- style="text-align:center; font-size:90%"
| 2021 || 7 || 201
|- style="text-align:center; font-size:90%"
| 2022 || 12 || 201
|- style="text-align:center; font-size:90%"
| 2023 || 1 || Current season
|- style="text-align:center; font-size:90%"

References

External links 
Rugby League Project
Rugby League Tables

National Rugby League lists
Sports penalties
Sports rules and regulations